The 1951 South Sydney was the 44th in the club's history. The club competed in the New South Wales Rugby Football League Premiership (NSWRFL), finishing the season as repeat premiers.

Ladder

Fixtures

Regular season

Finals

Records 

Many notable club and NSWRL/NRL records were set in the 1951 season.

Club records 

 Highest Score in a Grand Final:  42 points versus Manly-Warringah in 1951 (Souths won 42–14)
 Most Tries in a Grand Final:  8 tries versus Manly-Warringah in 1951
 Most Goals in a Grand Final:  9 goals versus Manly-Warringah in 1951
 Most Tries in a Grand Final by an Individual Player:  4 tries by John Graves versus Manly-Warringah in 1951
 Most Tries in a season by an Individual Player: 28 tries by John Graves from 17 games

NSWRL/NRL records 

 Most Tries in a season by an Individual Player

28 tries by John Graves at the time, tied Bobby Lulham (1947) for second (behind Dave Brown (1935) with 38). As of 2021, ranks as the 5th highest try total by a player in a season (tied with Tom Trbojevic - 2021 and Lulham - 1947).

References

South Sydney Rabbitohs seasons
South Sydney season